Sherif El Shemerly is an Egyptian volleyball coach. He is the Egyptian national volleyball team's coach. He was the coach of the Egyptian men's volleyball team at the 2016 Summer Olympics.

References 

Living people
Egyptian volleyball coaches
Volleyball coaches of international teams
Year of birth missing (living people)